Heart on Snow is the twelfth solo studio album by the British singer/songwriter Marc Almond. It was released by Blue Star Music, in conjunction with XIII BIS Records, on 21 October 2003.

Background
An article by the BBC describes how Almond "went to St Petersburg to interpret traditional Russian romance songs" to make what "may have become his most ambitious album so far". Almond mostly sang cover versions of traditional Russian songs, including a number from the Russian romance canon, and collaborated with a number of Russian artists on the album, such as Alla Bayanova and Lyudmila Zykina.

The album was released as a standard jewel case CD and a limited edition CD book in a slipcase containing a 44-page book with extensive background notes to all of the songs.

The single "Gone But Not Forgotten" was released from the album in September 2003 with two tracks ("Gosudaryunia" and "Just One Chance") and the video for the title track.

Critical reception

Reviews for Heart on Snow were mixed. Dorian Lynskey in The Guardian describes Heart on Snow as "a labour of love for which it's hard to feel much affection" and as lacking "the sly humour of Soft Cell and his best solo work" yet admires the "boldness and integrity in making an album that only uses Russian musicians". The review in Uncut states that Almond keeps his versions of the material "respectful which, despite the lack of Russian wildness, makes it (Heart on Snow) all the more moving". Paul Taylor in the Manchester Evening News describes the album as "a cunning mixture of smooth, westernised productions and balalaika-plucking, raw Russky folk stylings" and states that "anyone remotely broad-minded about their music would find this a joy"..

A Russian Komsomolskaya Pravda praised the interpretation of Gypsy romances ("Two Guitars", "The Glance of Your Dark Eyes"), described "Oh, My Soul" and "Luna" as "clash of decadence" and proclaimed "Gosudarynia" as the best track on the album.

Track listing

Note – there is a discrepancy with the titles of tracks 13 and 19 between the liner notes, "Glance From Your Dark Eyes"; and the track listing, "The Glance of Your Dark Eyes".

Personnel

In addition to artists credited in the track listing:

Marc Almond – vocals, translation adaptation
Martin Watkins – piano, original keyboards, arrangements
Andrei Samsonov – keyboards
Oleg Belov – keyboards, grand piano
Mikhail Aptekman – grand piano
Sergey Erdenko – violin
Georgij Osmolovskij – violin
Aliosha Bezlepkin – guitar
Vladimir Kudryavtsev – double bass
Grigory Voskoboynikov – double bass
Albert Potapkin – drums
Garij Bagdasaryan – drums
Oleg Sakmarov – flute
Andrej Vikharev – percussion
Sergej Shurakov – accordion
Kirill Kravtsov – cello
Alexandre Kiahidi – trumpet
Dmitrij Kuzmin – tuba
Karin Brown – French horn
Viktor Bastrakov – guitar
Maria Shurakova – mandolin
Vladimir Miller – bass vocal
Anatoli Sobolev – conductor
The St Petersburg Higher Naval Engineering Choir – choir
Gardemarin Youth Choir – choir
Julia Khutoretskaya – choir leader

References

2003 albums
Marc Almond albums